RHH may refer to:

Real Husbands of Hollywood, a reality TV show
Restore Hetch Hetchy, an environmental organization focused on the Hetch Hetchy Valley in Yosemite National Park
The Reverend Horton Heat, an American psychobilly band and the nickname of its leader, Jim Heath
Royal Hobart Hospital, a hospital in Tasmania

See also
RHHS (disambiguation)